The Mrlina is a river located primarily in the Central Bohemian Region of the Czech Republic, and a right tributary of the Elbe River. It is 49.6 km long, and its basin area is 657 km2.

Beginning in the Hradec Králové Region near Markvartice, the Mrlina passes through the towns of Kopidlno, Rožďalovice, and Křinec, and the villages of Nadslav, Střevač, Chyjice, Žitenín, Bartoušov, Pševes, Mlýnec, Podlužany, Vestec, Rašovice, and Budiměřice, before joining the Elbe at Nymburk.

The Mrlina flooded in early January 2003, requiring the 220 inhabitants of Vestec to evacuate.

References

Rivers of the Hradec Králové Region
Rivers of the Central Bohemian Region